Murmansk State Technical University or  MSTU is one of the oldest universities on the Kola peninsula. The university was founded in 1950. Initially it had a name of the High Marine School (HMS). Later it received the status of the Russian State Academy of Fishing Fleet and since 1996 it has become the Memek State Technical University, the biggest and the most prestigious educational Center in the Far North of Russia and undoubtedly one of the biggest and famous in the whole North-West of the country.

The Faculties of MSTU
Today Murmansk State Technical University comprises three faculties, four institutes and the Marine Academy. Mesiatsev Murmansk Marine Fishing College and Arkhangelsk Fishing Technical College count as branches of MSTU (together with branches in Poliarnyi and Apatity).

 The Marine Academy(including the Faculty of Advanced Training for the Fleet Commanding Staff)
 The Faculty of Arctic Technologies
 The Faculty of Part-Time Education
 The Faculty of Social and Economic Studies (part-time programs)
 The Institute of Natural Science and Technology
 The Institute of Economics, Management and Law
 The Institute of Distance Learning
 The Further Professional Education Institute

References

Universities in Russia
Murmansk
Technical universities and colleges in Russia